Fabrizio Buonocore (born 28 April 1977) is an Italian water polo player who competed in the 2004 Summer Olympics and in the 2008 Summer Olympics.

See also
 List of World Aquatics Championships medalists in water polo

References

External links
 

1977 births
Living people
Italian male water polo players
Olympic water polo players of Italy
Water polo players at the 2004 Summer Olympics
Water polo players at the 2008 Summer Olympics
World Aquatics Championships medalists in water polo
Water polo players from Naples